An Ninh is a commune (xã) and village in Quảng Ninh District, Quảng Bình Province, Vietnam.

An Ninh was the birthplace of Monsignor Philippe Trần Văn Hoài.

Populated places in Quảng Bình province
Communes of Quảng Bình province